Pierre Marie Jean-Baptiste Mairesse-Lebrun (16 March 1912 – 6 December 2003) was a French Army cavalry officer who became famous for his escape from Colditz castle as a World War II prisoner of war. He was born in Bauzy, Loir-et-Cher. 

Lebrun served as a captain in the 4th regiment Chasseurs de l'Afrique and was captured during the Fall of France. He was sent to Oflag IV-C, at Colditz Castle, from which he escaped on 2 July 1941.

After a walk in the park all POWs gathered to be counted and be escorted back to the main castle. At this moment all guards, who stood around the park fences, also returned to the park entrance, leaving the back fences unguarded. Mairesse Lebrun and Lieutenant Pierre Odry used this opportunity to leave the group, and together they ran to the fence at the backside of the park.  Odry catapulted Mairesse Lebrun over the fence where he ran away. The German guards were so stunned that they did nothing initially; when they recovered, they started shooting without success. Still in his sports clothes, Lebrun hid in a field and via  Switzerland reached Vichy France.

In December 1941 he went to Spain, where he was arrested. He tried to escape again but fractured his spine paralysing his legs.

On 20 July 1946 he married Christine Solvay (1922–2006).

Lebrun was created a Commandeur de la Légion d'honneur.

References

Sources
 Leo de Hartog; Officieren achter prikkeldraad 1940-1945, uitgeverij hollandia 1983
 Entry at Planète Généalogie
 Henry Chancellor, Colditz: The Definitive History, London 2001, "based on television programmes produced for Channel Four Television", pp. 51–58.

1912 births
2003 deaths
French Army officers
French Army personnel of World War II
Prisoners of war held at Colditz Castle
French escapees
Escapees from German detention